WARH (106.5 MHz "106-5 The Arch") is a commercial FM radio station licensed to Granite City, Illinois and serving Greater St. Louis including sections of Illinois and Missouri.  WARH is owned by Hubbard Broadcasting and airs an Adult Hits radio format. The studios and offices are in Creve Coeur, Missouri (although a St. Louis address is used).  The transmitter is located near Resurrection Cemetery off Mackenzie Road in St. Louis.

"106-5 The Arch" using the primary slogan "You never know what we're going to play next."  The station's name pays tribute to the iconic Gateway Arch monument in Downtown St. Louis on the western bank of the Mississippi River. The format is musically similar to the syndicated Jack FM stations in the U.S. and Canada. However, "The Arch" uses a live and local DJ staff around the clock, whereas "Jack" stations are for the most part automated with no live voices. 106.5 The Arch uses voice actor Howard Cogan for voice imaging. Cogan was the former voice of the network syndicated version of Jack FM. 

WARH broadcasts in the HD Radio format; WARH-HD2 carries co-owned KTMY from Minneapolis, known as "My Talk Radio." (Before March 2017, it featured less familiar rock songs from the 1960s to the present, branded as "106-5 The Deep.") WARH-HD3 carries an all-80s hits format branded as “My 80s Mix”; this launched on WARH-HD3 in May 2021, after being moved from KSHE's HD3 sub-channel.

History

Country (1965-1977)
On November 24, 1965, WGNU-FM first signed on as the FM counterpart of WGNU (920 AM), under the ownership of Chuck Norman. Both stations simulcast a country music format for Granite City and its surrounding communities.

AOR (1977-1987) 
In 1977, Norman sold the FM station to Doubleday Broadcasting, who would boost the station's signal to cover most of the St. Louis radio market.  The call sign was changed to WWWK, with the station simulcasting the album oriented rock (AOR) format of KWK (1380 AM, now KXFN).  The stations called themselves "Stereo WK."

In November 1986, the two stations were bought by Chase Broadcasting.

Top 40 (1987-1993) 
The simulcast ended in 1987, with AM 1380 flipping to oldies as KGLD, while FM 106.5 (now with the call sign KWK-FM) moved to a Top 40/CHR format.

In February 1988, KWK-FM changed call letters to WKBQ-FM, and retained the Top 40 format, but would rebrand as "Q106.5." In September 1991, WKBQ-FM brought the morning team of "Steve & DC" to St. Louis from Birmingham, Alabama. In 1993, "Steve & DC" and WKBQ-FM would face controversy over comments made during the May 10th morning show, and was the subject of much local news coverage for weeks. Also in 1993, WKBQ-FM again was simulcast on AM 1380.

Country (1993-2000)
In late 1993, WKBQ-FM was purchased by Zimmer Radio Group of Cape Girardeau, Missouri.  On January 20, 1994, WKBQ-FM and country-formatted sister station WKKX would swap frequencies, with WKBQ-FM moving to 104.1 FM, and WKKX moving to 106.5 FM (AM 1380 would continue to simulcast WKBQ-FM after the swap). The station became "New Country Kix 106.5," with the popular morning duo "Steve & DC" heard for the second time on the 106.5 MHz frequency.  That led to the team scoring its biggest ratings in St. Louis. The "Steve & DC" morning show consistently ranked #1 in the all-important Persons 18-49 and Persons 25-54 demographics on WKKX.

In November 1996, Emmis Broadcasting bought the station.

Smooth jazz (2000-2005) 
In 2000, Emmis swapped WKKX to Bonneville International for Los Angeles country music station KZLA (now KLLI).  At 12:00 a.m. on October 4, 2000, after the sale to Bonneville closed, WKKX changed call letters to WSSM and adopted a Smooth Jazz format as "Smooth 106.5" (later "106.5 Smooth Jazz").

Adult hits (2005-present) 
On April 10, 2005, after playing "Thank You" by Euge Groove, the station adopted its current adult hits format, branded as "106-5 The Arch." The first song on "The Arch" was "Roll With the Changes" by REO Speedwagon. The station adopted its current WARH call letters on April 18, 2005. WARH was initially programmed by Jules Riley. The Program Director since 2016 is Scott Roddy, who also serves as the Program Director for sister station WIL-FM.

On January 19, 2011, Bonneville announced the sale of WARH, as well as 16 other stations in four markets (St. Louis, Chicago, Cincinnati and Washington, D.C.), to Minneapolis-based Hubbard Broadcasting.  The sale was completed on April 29, 2011.  Hubbard has kept the adult hits format in place, which continues as one of St. Louis' top ten stations.

References

External links
WARH official website
MissouriRadio.net

KWK FM 106 AM 13.8 A tribute site for KWK "The Rockin' Best!"

ARH
Adult hits radio stations in the United States
Radio stations established in 1965
Hubbard Broadcasting